Afanasy Feodorovich Kovalyov (15 December 1903 – 20 July 1993) was a Soviet statesman, the Chairman of the Council of People's Commissars of the Byelorussian Soviet Socialist Republic from 10 September 1937 to 28 July 1938 and deputy of the Supreme Soviet of the 1st convocation.

References 

1903 births
1993 deaths
People from Barysaw District
People from Borisovsky Uyezd
Communist Party of the Soviet Union members
First convocation members of the Soviet of the Union
Members of the Central Committee of the Communist Party of Byelorussia
Heads of government of the Byelorussian Soviet Socialist Republic
Prisoners and detainees of the Soviet Union
Soviet rehabilitations